This is a list of Hanoverian princesses from the accession of George III to the throne of the Kingdom of Hanover in 1814. Individuals holding the title of princess will usually also be styled "Her Royal Highness"  (HRH). Despite Hanover's annexation by Prussia in 1866, male-line descendants of George III continue to style themselves as a prince or princess of Hanover. The eldest daughter of George III, Charlotte, Princess Royal, is not included, as she was married before her father's accession to the throne.

The title Princess of Hanover and the use of the style "Royal Highness" has generally been restricted to the following persons:
the legitimate daughters of a Hanoverian Sovereign,
the legitimate male line female descendants of a Hanoverian Sovereign

List of Hanoverian princesses since 1814

{|class="wikitable sortable" 
|+ List of Hanoverian Princesses 
|-
!style="width:30%" |Name
!style="width:5%" |Born
!style="width:5%" |Died
!style="width:30%" |Royal lineage
!style="width:30%" |Notes
|-
|style="background:#d0def8"| Princess Charlotte The Princess Royal Queen consort of Württemberg
|style="background:#d0def8"|29 September 1766
|style="background:#d0def8"|5 October 1828
|style="background:#d0def8"|1st daughter of King George III
|style="background:#d0def8"|Title held from father's accession to death.
|-
|style="background:#d0def8"| Princess Augusta Sophia Princess Augusta Sophia
|style="background:#d0def8"|8 November 1768
|style="background:#d0def8"|22 September 1840
|style="background:#d0def8"|2nd daughter of King George III
|style="background:#d0def8"|Title held from father's accession to death.
|-
|style="background:#d0def8"| Princess Elizabeth Princess Elizabeth later, Landgravine of Hesse-Homburg
|style="background:#d0def8"|22 May 1770
|style="background:#d0def8"|10 January 1840
|style="background:#d0def8"|3rd daughter of King George III
|style="background:#d0def8"|Title held from father's accession to death.
|-
|style="background:#d0def8"| Princess Mary Princess Mary later, Duchess of Gloucester and Edinburgh
|style="background:#d0def8"|25 April 1776
|style="background:#d0def8"|30 April 1857
|style="background:#d0def8"|4th daughter of King George III
|style="background:#d0def8"|Title held from father's accession to death.
|-
|style="background:#d0def8"| Princess Sophia Princess Sophia
|style="background:#d0def8"|25 April 1776
|style="background:#d0def8"|30 April 1857
|style="background:#d0def8"|5th daughter of King George III
|style="background:#d0def8"|Title held from father's accession to death.
|-
|style="background:#d0def8"| Princess Amelia Princess Amelia
|style="background:#d0def8"|7 August 1783
|style="background:#d0def8"|2 November 1810
|style="background:#d0def8"|6th daughter of King George III
|style="background:#d0def8"|Title held from father's accession to death.
|-
|style="background:#ead0f8"| Princess Charlotte Princess Charlottelater, Princess of Saxe-Coburg-Saalfeld
|style="background:#ead0f8"|7 January 1796
|style="background:#ead0f8"|6 November 1817
|style="background:#ead0f8"|Only daughter of King George IV& Granddaughter of King George III
|style="background:#ead0f8"|Title held from grandfather's accession to death.
|-
|style="background:#ead0f8"| Princess Charlotte Princess Charlotte
|style="background:#ead0f8"|10 December 1821
|style="background:#ead0f8"|4 March 1821
|style="background:#ead0f8"|Only daughter of King William& Granddaughter of King George III
|style="background:#ead0f8"|Title held from her birth to death.
|-
|style="background:#ead0f8"| Princess Victoria Princess Victorialater Queen of the United Kingdom
|style="background:#ead0f8"|24 May 1819
|style="background:#ead0f8"|22 January 1901
|style="background:#ead0f8"|Only daughter of Prince Edward& Granddaughter of King George III
|style="background:#ead0f8"|Title held from her birth to death.
|-
|style="background:#ead0f8"| Princess Augusta Princess Augustalater, Grand Duchess of Mecklenburg-Strelitz
|style="background:#ead0f8"|19 July 1822
|style="background:#ead0f8"|5 December 1916
|style="background:#ead0f8"|1st daughter of Prince Adolphus& Granddaughter of King George III
|style="background:#ead0f8"|Title held from her birth to death.
|-
|style="background:#ead0f8"| Princess Mary Adelaide Princess Mary Adelaidelater, Duchess of Teck|style="background:#ead0f8"|27 November 1833
|style="background:#ead0f8"|27 October 1897
|style="background:#ead0f8"|2nd daughter of Prince Adolphus& Granddaughter of King George III
|style="background:#ead0f8"|Title held from her birth to death.
|-
|style="background:#ead0f8"| Princess Frederica Princess Fredericalater, Baroness von Pawel-Rammingen|style="background:#ead0f8"|9 January 1848
|style="background:#ead0f8"|16 October 1926
|style="background:#ead0f8"|1st daughter of King George V& Gt-granddaughter of King George III
|style="background:#ead0f8"|Title held from her birth to death.
|-
|style="background:#ead0f8"| Princess Marie Princess Marie
|style="background:#ead0f8"|2 December 1849
|style="background:#ead0f8"|4 June 1904
|style="background:#ead0f8"|2nd daughter of King George V& Gt-Granddaughter of King George III
|style="background:#ead0f8"|Title held from her birth to death.
|-
|}

Princess Marie Louise of Hanover 11 October 1879 – 31 January 1948 Princess of BadenPrincess Alexandra of Hanover 29 September 1882 – 30 August 1963 Grand Duke of Mecklenburg-SchwerinPrincess Olga of Hanover 11 July 1884 – 21 September 1958
Frederica of Hanover 18 April 1917 – 6 February 1981 Queen consort of Greece''